José Villegas Cruz (born April 6, 1996, in Aguascalientes, Mexico) is a Mexican professional footballer who plays for Mazorqueros F.C. of Liga Premier de México as a defender.

References

Footballers from Aguascalientes
Liga MX players
1996 births
Living people
C.F. Pachuca players
Mexican footballers
Association football defenders